A dressmaker is a person who makes custom clothing for a person.

Dressmaker may refer to:
 dressmaker (band), a London-based post punk band
 The Dressmaker (Bainbridge novel), a 1973 gothic psychological novel written by Beryl Bainbridge
 The Dressmaker (Ham novel), a 2000 gothic novel written by the Australian author Rosalie Ham
 The Dressmaker (1988 film), a 1988 film based on Bainbridge's novel
 The Dressmaker (2015 film), a 2015 film based on Ham's novel